Sir Frank Crossley Mappin, 6th Baronet (15 August 1884 – 25 January 1975) was a New Zealand orchardist, horticulturist and philanthropist. He was born in Scampton, Lincolnshire, England on 15 August 1884.

He and his wife donated their Auckland home, which they had called Birchlands, to the New Zealand government to be used as Government House.

Businessman Sir Rob Fenwick was his grandson.

Arms

References

1884 births
1975 deaths
New Zealand horticulturists
New Zealand philanthropists
English emigrants to New Zealand
New Zealand orchardists
People from Scampton
20th-century philanthropists
Baronets in the Baronetage of the United Kingdom